Heath Cemetery in Harbonnières, France is a cemetery operated by the Commonwealth War Graves Commission, for British Empire soldiers of the Somme campaign during World War I.

Heath Cemetery is situated on the south side of the main road (D1029) from  Amiens to St Quentin, approximately 3km north to northeast of the village Harbonnières and 13 km east from Villers-Bretonneux. The cemetery has 1860 plots and was designed by Sir Reginald Blomfield.

Located in the Somme, Harbonnières was captured by French troops in the summer of 1916, retaken by the Germans on 27 April 1918, and regained by the Australian Corps on 8 August 1918.

Notable burials
 Robert Beatham, recipient of the Victoria Cross
 Eric Brookes, British World War I flying ace
 Michael Gonne, World War I flying ace
 Alfred Gaby,  recipient of the Victoria Cross
 William Reginald Rawlings, first Aboriginal commissioned officer in Australian Military Forces

See also
 Mont Saint-Quentin Australian war memorial
 Villers–Bretonneux Australian National Memorial

References

External links
 

Australian military cemeteries
British military memorials and cemeteries
World War I cemeteries in France
Monuments and memorials in France
Buildings and structures in Nord (French department)
Commonwealth War Graves Commission cemeteries in France